Tenovus Cancer Care is a Welsh cancer charity that supports cancer patients and their families, funds cancer research, and works to raise awareness on how to prevent cancer.

History
Tenovus Cancer Care was established in 1943 by ten businessmen (hence the 'ten of us'). Those men were D.R.Edwards, C.Harris, G. Brinn, C.E.Rolfe, D.Curitz, G.T.Addis, T.J.E. Price, H.Thomas, H.E.Gosling and T.Curitz.

Initially, the charity funded a range of local projects in health and social field. In 1964, Tenovus Cancer Care embarked on a project that was to influence their work over the next 40 years. D.R. Edwards, the founder Chairman of the group of ten, cut the first sod on the site of the Tenovus Institute for Cancer Research in Cardiff. Since then, Tenovus Cancer Care has concentrated its efforts on cancer, and Tenovus Cancer Care scientists have been recognised for their pioneering work.

Tenovus Cancer Care remains the biggest Wales-based funder of cancer research and has developed a range of services to support cancer patients directly, including a free Support Line, benefits advice, two Mobile Cancer Support Units and 'Sing with Us' choirs across the country. In 2018, the charity celebrates its 75th anniversary.

Research
The charity has funded scientists who have contributed to discoveries that have helped treat and care for millions of cancer patients all around the world. For example, in 1975 researchers showed that a contraceptive pill could halt the growth of breast cancers, leading to the birth of Tamoxifen, which is now taken by millions of women worldwide.

Tenovus Cancer Care now spends around £1M on research each year both on laboratory research to help develop new treatments for cancer, and research in the community to help local people and their families. Currently the charity funds PhD studentships in Cardiff, Swansea and Bangor universities.

Cancer Support
Tenovus Cancer Care's first Mobile Support Unit was launched in February 2009. Since its launch, the Unit has opened its services in more than 50 locations and has accommodated over 5,000 patients and visitors. Working with Velindre NHS Trust, Tenovus Cancer Care has been delivering chemotherapy and other cancer treatments in Cwmbran and Nantgarw. During this period, over 10,000 treatments have been provided. In October 2013 the second Mobile Support Unit was launched to deliver support for people with lymphoedema, an incurable condition which can be a side-effect of cancer treatment. In October 2018, HRH The Princess Royal unveiled the charity's new £1m Mobile Support Unit, the largest mobile chemotherapy treatment unit in the world. It is 60% bigger than the first Mobile Support Unit, with seven chemotherapy chairs and is capable of seeing 30 patients a day and delivering more than 8,500 treatments a year. Calculations show that the two existing Mobile Support Units save the NHS in Wales more than £1m a year, and the new Mobile Support Unit could deliver more than 125,000 treatments over the course its lifetime.

In 2014, Tenovus Cancer Care joined forces with Movember and Prostate Cancer UK to launch the UK's first ManVan, a 38-foot American Motorhome which offers men a safe, relaxing space in which to discuss issues around male cancers such as prostate and testicular cancer. During the three-year project, the ManVan had more than 6,200 visitors, helped over 600 men who had a cancer diagnosis and offered around 4,000 appointments. It visited almost 100 locations across the country and travelled over 42,326 miles.
Tenovus Cancer Care also has a 14-strong team of Cancer Support Advisors, offering help, guidance and support through its multi-disciplinary service, allowing patients and their families to access a number of services directly through the charity. The team provides advice about welfare benefits for cancer patients and helps people apply for grants, blue badges and other essential support.

Tenovus Cancer Care has a national free Support Line (0808 808 1010), which is open 8am-8pm, 365 days a year. They more recently launched a proactive telephone chemotherapy callback service (Tenovus Cancer Care Callback) where a Tenovus Cancer Care Nurse Specialist contacts cancer patients throughout their treatment to provide advice and support.

Sing with Us choirs
In 2012, Tenovus Cancer Care launched the 'Sing with Us' project, funded by the Big Lottery, to run 15 choirs across Wales for cancer patients, survivors, their families and people bereaved through cancer.  Initial research conducted by Cardiff University and Tenovus Cancer Care has proved that singing in the choirs reduces anxiety and pain, as well as helping to improve physical function. Tenovus Cancer Care's work in this area also featured in the October 2012 Channel 4 documentary 'Sing For Your Life', where the charity set up a choir of cancer patients that performed at the Royal Albert Hall.

In late 2014, Tenovus Cancer Care set up their first Sing with Us choir outside Wales, in Guildford, Surrey. In 2015, Tenovus Cancer Care conducted research with the Royal College of Music in London into the benefits of singing. By taking saliva samples from around 200 choir members before, and after rehearsal, they showed singing in one of their choirs was effective at reducing peoples' anxiety and depression, and had a positive impact on biological markers related to stress, immune function and inflammatory response. This research is now being expanded on with a two-year study with the Royal College of Music and the Royal Marsden Hospital.

See also 
 Cancer in the United Kingdom

References

External links
Tenovus Cancer Care Official website

Health charities in the United Kingdom
Cancer organisations based in the United Kingdom